Fredrik Oppegård (born 7 August 2002) is a Norwegian professional footballer who plays for Dutch club Go Ahead Eagles on loan from PSV, as a left back.

Club career
Born in Oslo, Oppegård spent his early career with KFUM and Vålerenga, before signing with Dutch club PSV, where he made his professional debut.

On 29 January 2023, Oppegård joined Go Ahead Eagles on loan for the rest of the 2022–23 season.

International career
Oppegård has represented Norway at youth international level.

Honours
PSV Eindhoven

 KNVB Cup: 2021–22

Johan Cruyff Shield: 2021, 2022

References

2002 births
Footballers from Oslo
Living people
Norwegian footballers
Norway youth international footballers
Norway under-21 international footballers
Association football defenders
Vålerenga Fotball players
Jong PSV players
PSV Eindhoven players
Go Ahead Eagles players
Eerste Divisie players
Eredivisie players
Norwegian expatriate footballers
Norwegian expatriates in the Netherlands
Expatriate footballers in the Netherlands